"I Wanna Be Your Man" is the second single from Ironik's debut album No Point in Wasting Tears. The song  samples the 1987 song "I Want to Be Your Man" by funk/R&B artist Roger . The song peaked at No. 35 on the official UK Singles Chart.

Music video
The video features Ironik in different scenes through Paris where he is in the studio recording this track. It also features him driving in a car looking for the girl of his dreams.

Track listing
UK CD single
"I Wanna Be Your Man" - original version

UK Maxi-single
"I Wanna Be Your Man" - radio edit
"I Wanna Be Your Man" - Tinchy Stryder/Ghetto remix

Chart performance

References

2008 singles
Ironik songs
Songs written by Ironik
2008 songs
Asylum Records singles